Official name is Borgring 
Borrering (1682: Borre Ring; 1877 & 1992: Borrering) also known as Vallø Borgring or Vallo ring-fortress (also Borgringen ved Lellinge, Lellinge Ringborg, Borgring, Borgerring, Borring and other names) is a Danish Viking fortification located on Zealand, east of Gammel [Gl.] Lellingegaard in the parish of Højelse and north-east of Lellinge. The ring sits on land under the Chapter of Vallø (the land and Gl. Lellingegaard has been a part of the estate of Vallø (later Chapter of Vallø) since 1721).

Description 

Borrering is circular in shape and spans 145 metres across and thus ranks third among the original, Danish Viking ring fortresses. It featured a 10–11-meter wide rampart and was shielded by a palisade, made by pointed wooden stakes. No fortification moat has been uncovered, but the Ellebækken stream running due west of the fortification might have offered a natural defence as might a small lake to the north/north-east. During the excavation in 2014 the northern and eastern gates were found exactly where they would be expected to be in a trelleborg-type fortification.

Borrering could join the group of trelleborgs which include Trelleborg at Slagelse, Nonnebakken at Odense, Fyrkat at Hobro and Aggersborg next to The Limfjord. These fortifications have all been dated to ca. 980 a.d. However, conclusive dating of Borrering remains to be done.

During the Viking Age the fortress would have enjoyed a strategic, geographical advantage overlooking the intersection of the old high roads from Roskilde and Ringsted extending as far as the two streams in Køge Ådal, which at this time was a ship-ready fjord and one of the best natural ports on Zealand, offering easy access to the Bay of Køge.

Name 
Borrering is the name of the fortress as well as the area. The written sources for this dates back to 1682.
The name has been subject to some modification through the ages leading to a plethora of variations in different contexts.
The name may also have been used either to denote the Viking Age fortification itself or the bank immediately east of Gl. Lellingegård:

«the place name with great certitude has moved geographically. Maps from the late 1800s will reveal Borgring or Boring to be the name of a small forest some 300 metres west of the ring fortress.» 

In 1682 the name Borrering is also synonymous with Borre Rings Aggere and Borre Rings Agre. An undated land register (pre-1850 ?) supplies the name Borrerings Mark, and a guide from 1860 offers Borgrings Marken. Military and topographical maps through the ages contain versions such as Boring (1897) and Borgring (1911, 1941 and 1983), and a forest map from 1925 uses Borgringen.

In 1875, the variant Borgerring was used.
 
In 1877 Anders Petersen uses the form Borrering in his book: Vallø og Omegn.

The 3rd and 4th editions of Trap Danmark (Statistisk-topografisk Beskrivelse af Kongeriget Danmark) from 1898 and 1921, respectively, use the name Borgering.

The version Borring appears in an old legend, and is used a few times between 1911 and 1946.

All Danish fortifications used to be registered by the Danish National Museum's Department of Middle Ages even when finds, such as Borrering, were not from that age. The Museum registered the ring fortress as Borrering, and when Harald Andersen submitted an article to the magazine Skalk in 1992 in which he "dragged" the pre-Medieval fortifications out of the darkness, Borrering was consequently referred to in this version:

«Borrering, Højelse parish. Circular embankment/grave about 140 m. across, today used for farming. Find dating from early Roman times.»

«Two major fortresses on Bornholm [....], both from late Iron Age, are clearly refuges while it is less clear if this is also the case with the two remaining fortresses of this magnitude, viz.  a circular fortress located just outside Køge, pottery-dated to Roman times, and [....]»

"Borrering, Højelse s. Kredsrund vold/grav, ca 140 m i diam., nu helt nedpløjet. Fund fra ældre romertid." [in Danish]

"To storborge på Bornholm [....] begge dateret til yngre jernalder, er utvivlsomt tilflugtssteder, mens det er mere usikkert, om det samme gælder de to andre anlæg, som endnu er tilbage i denne størrelsesklasse, nemlig en kredsrund borg beliggende tæt uden for Køge, skårdateret til romertid, og [....]" [in Danish]

The name Borrering has therefore been used several times since 1992, e.g. in 2009, 2010 and 2011.

The primary name of Borrering has been recorded by The Department of Nordic Research (Nordisk Forskningsinstitut) at University of Copenhagen, although the department only records instances found on maps and in land registers while ignoring literature and other institutes. Therefore, the versions of the name used by Sophus Müller, Trap Danmark, during the excavations led by Thorkild Ramskou in 1971–72, in the National Museum registry and Harald Andersen are not mentioned. The department has not registered usage of the recent past. This means that the recordings of The Department of Nordic Research as for now is of limited usability as a source to naming convention and usage concerning Borrering over the years - including the recent years.

Lately, other versions have appeared almost supplanting the original name. Especially in 2013–2014 there has been a trend towards new names for the fortress. Borgringen ved Lellinge has been used a few times in 2013–2014, and the shorter version Borgring on several occasions. The Chapter of Vallø stirred waters when, during publication of the preliminary excavation results in September 2014, they wanted to rename the fortress Vallø Borgring. In response to this and following vocal opposition, a Facebook group was created on 8 September 2014 to promote the name Lellinge Ringborg. This version has been used by the Viking Ship Museum in Roskilde.

"Borre" as a name or word has several denotations in Danish, but for this discussion it seems most relevant to consider "fortified site" or just "fortress". So, in terms of naming, Borrering becomes part of a group of pre-historic fortifications that include Borremose fortified settlement in Himmerland, Borreknold on Falster and Borrehoved on Bornholm.

Legends 
It is said about the largest church bell in Højelse that ..., upon its inaugural knell, the ancient castle of »Borring« by Lellinge stream sank deep into the earth.

Research history 
The place Borre Ring  is first mentioned in a 1682 land register as part of Christian V's cadastral map.

The fortress is reportedly outlined on an 1805 land map of Lellingegård.

The fortress was first codified by Sophus Müller in 1875:
«Right to the east of the farm [Gl. Lellingegaard] lies a bank called "Borgerring" and by virtue of its location next to the stream [...]»
although no certain date has been offered.

The US Air Force aerial photo (ortho-photo) from Basic Cover 1954 and provided by COWI shows the fortress as a somewhat blurry shadow on the field.

It was only after echo-photography in November 1970 that it became clear that there might be an actual trelleborg near Lellinge (the circular structure was recognized on a photography by warrant officer Valdemar Ryhl from Air Base Karup).

In 1971–72, the Danish National Museum, represented by Thorkild Ramskou, conducted excavations on the site, but the research technology available at the time left the embankment itself undated. Evidences of settlement and middens were dated to the Roman Iron Age. No evidence of later settlements was found at the excavation site. Prior to work there was a general expectation that the excavation would reveal and document that the fortress ring was from the Viking Age and similar to the other known Viking ring fortresses. This expectation, however, was not satisfied.

Some forty years later, professor Søren Sindbæk of University of Aarhus were working on a major book on Aggersborg, when he recognized a clear pattern to the location of the other fortresses; it soon became clear that there was a fortress missing in eastern Zealand. The trelleborgs are placed a day's march apart, i.e. about 30–40 kilometres. This distance was also apparent between the nearest fortress Trelleborg at Slagelse and the now already known Borrering at Lellinge, which could not previously be counted as a Viking trelleborg.

In 2014 further archeological research by Danish Castle Centre and University of Aarhus and with some important help from Helen Goodchild from University of York showed that Borrering dates back to the 10th century. Remnants of burnt gates were also found possibly suggesting war activity of the kind found in Trelleborg at Slagelse, where nineteen arrows were found inside the fortress. Up until 2014, the fortress has only been mentioned a few times in literature, leaving one of the largest circular fortresses in Denmark in relative obscurity. As yet only minor sections of the fortress have been unearthed.

Despite the geometric plan, in line with other trelleborgs, the gates of Borrering are not perfectly aligned north, east, south and west. The minor dislocation (11°) probably reflects concerns that the fortress would emerge asymmetrical in the landscape if the prevailing building principles were rigorously obeyed.

Excavations will continue in 2015.

Builder 
Harald Bluetooth is presumed to be the master builder of the other Danish trelleborg-type fortresses, and it seems plausible that he may indeed have built the ring fortress at Lellinge, too. The fortress remains to be conclusively dated, however, rendering Harald Bluetooth's involvement likely but not proven.

See also 
 Aggersborg
 Borgeby Castle
 Fyrkat
 Harald Bluetooth
 Nonnebakken
 Trelleborg (Slagelse)
 Viking ring fortress
 Vikings

Footnotes

References

External links 
 Press release  from Danish Castle Centre [in Danish]
 Newly Discovered Viking Fortress Could Have Been a Launch Point for Invading England, by Rachel Nuwer, Smithsonian.com, 9 September 2014
 Vikingeborg fundet ved Køge, Sjællandske Medier, 5. September 2014 [in Danish]
 Vikingeborg kan ændre datering af Køge af Katrine Wied, Dagbladet (Sjællandske Medier), 5. September 2014, p. 16-17 [in Danish]
 Arkæologer: Flere vikingeborge vil dukke op, Videnskab.dk, 9. September 2014 [in Danish]
 Borgring: the discovery of a Viking Age ring fortress, by Helen Goodchild, Nanna Holm and Søren M. Sindbæk, Antiquity, Volume 91, Issue 358, August 2017, pp. 1027-1042
Science Magazine. 2017. "Thousand-year-old Viking fortress reveals a technologically advanced society." Includes a Q&A with Søren M. Sindbæk.

 
Viking ring fortresses
Forts in Denmark
Archaeological sites in Denmark